4.35am is an EP by Irish singer-songwriter Gemma Hayes. Her first official release came out in 2001 on the Source Records label.

The track 4.35am appeared on the soundtrack for the 2006 movie flicka starring Mario Bello. Piano Song features Gemma unaccompanied on Piano. This is the first time Gemma recorded a song for piano only. Song for Julie a B side on the single for Back of my hand is the only other known recording of solo piano pieces by Hayes.

Track listing
All songs written by Gemma Hayes.

 "Gotta Low"
 "Making Waves"
 "Evening Sun"
 "4.35am."
 "Piano Song"

Charts

References

Gemma Hayes albums
2001 EPs